Warszawa Okęcie railway station is a railway station in the Ursynów district of Warsaw, Poland. It is served by Koleje Mazowieckie, which runs services from Warszawa Wschodnia to Góra Kalwaria and Skarżysko-Kamienna.

Unelectrified single track spur lines branch from the station to the Kabaty Depot of Warsaw Metro and the Siekierki Power Station.

References
Station article at kolej.one.pl

External links

Okecie
Railway stations served by Koleje Mazowieckie